Marat Safin (born 14 March 1972 in Sverdlovsk) is a former Russian football player.

References

1972 births
Living people
Soviet footballers
Russian footballers
FC Ural Yekaterinburg players
Russian Premier League players
FC Uralets Nizhny Tagil players
Association football forwards